The City Center Building, known briefly as Centennial Tower, was the tallest building in Hayward, California. It was previously the second tallest, until the 2013 razing of Warren Hall on the Cal State East Bay campus. It was for many years an abandoned building, located between Foothill Boulevard and City Center Drive, in the City Center section of Downtown Hayward, adjacent to the PlazaCenter mall. It was formerly used as Hayward City Hall.

Demolition of the building began in January 2020 and was completed by September 2020.

History 
The City of Hayward opened the steel reinforced concrete building on October 18, 1969. It was originally planned to have 20 floors and a cinema, but only 11 floors were built, with no cinema. The building served as Hayward's city hall from 1969 to 1998. Its top floor was the seat of municipal government and other floors were leased to businesses. It was designed to replace the old Hayward city hall, now located at Alex Giulini Plaza. It was the first building in the planned City Center complex. Architectural critic Allan Temko nicknamed the building "the toaster" in the 1970s, strongly influencing public opinion against it. The Centennial Hall Convention Center was added to the complex.

In the 1980s, the PlazaCenter complex of retail and commercial businesses was built next to it, on the former grounds of Hayward High School.

The 1989 Loma Prieta earthquake damaged the building's structural integrity and the city government moved out of the building.
In 1998, after the completion of the new city hall, the building was closed to the public. The city sold the building for $1.5 million in 1998 to a developer who planned to convert it to condominiums. They renamed it "Centennial Tower" and sold it to another developer. Condominium conversion was never implemented, as it was considered too expensive. In 2006 plans were made to demolish the building. A year later, the demolition was canceled. On November 1, 2009, the adjacent Centennial Hall Convention Center closed, and was subsequently demolished.

New Hayward City Hall 
The new City Hall opened in January 1998. It is located at B Street and Watkins Street, next to the Hayward BART station.

Current conditions 
The building remained vacant. The interior walls, pipes and heating system have been removed. There were numerous broken or boarded-up windows. Graffiti is visible on the windows and top floors. In January 2008 a fence was erected around the building to deter vandalism. In March 2010 a fire broke out on the top floors of the tower. Homeless people have occupied the first floor, and taken out copper pipes to sell as scrap.

Plans for the site 
Plans were announced in early 2008 for remodeling the tower, including seismic retrofitting and conversion to office space. There were also plans to build condominiums over the Centennial Hall parking garage, which has also been demolished. 
The building closed in 2009. In 2010, the city opened bidding for its demolition. Instead of demolition, the site only had hazardous materials removed.

References

1969 establishments in California
1998 disestablishments in California
Buildings and structures demolished in 2020
Buildings and structures in Hayward, California
Demolished buildings and structures in California
Government of Hayward, California
Landmarks in the San Francisco Bay Area
Office buildings completed in 1969
Skyscraper office buildings in California
Skyscrapers in California